The 2008–09 New Mexico State Aggies men's basketball team represented New Mexico State University in the 2008–09 college basketball season. This was Marvin Menzies 2nd season as head coach. The Aggies played their home games at Pan American Center and competed in the Western Athletic Conference. They finished the season 17–15, 9–7 in WAC play. They lost in the 2nd round of the 2009 WAC men's basketball tournament to end the season.

Pre-season

2008–09 Team

Roster
Source

Coaching staff

2008-09 Schedule and results
All times are Mountain

|-
!colspan=9 style=| Exhibition

|-

|-
!colspan=9 style=| Regular Season

|-
!colspan=9 style=| WAC tournament

|-
The attendance for the 16 home games was 99,839 which averaged 6,240 per game.

Statistics leaders
 Scoring - Jahmar Young, 17.9 pts/g
 Field Goal % - Hamidu Rahman, 53.0%
 3-point Field Goal % - Jahmar Young, 42.1%
 Free Throws - Jahmar Young, 82.4%
 Rebounds - Wendell McKines, 10.0 Reb/g
 Assists - Hernst Laroche, 139
 Blocks - Hamidu Rahman, 44
 Steals - Jonathan Gibson, Hernst Laroche, Jahmar Young; 44

Ring of Honor Additions
During the Jan 31, 2009 game against Hawaii, a ceremony was held which added new Aggies to the Ring of Honor - they were Jimmy Collins, Jerry Hines, and John Williamson. Also recognized were the 1978–79 and 1998-99 teams which each appeared in the NCAA Tournament.

Season highlights
 Jahmar Young was named First Team All WAC
 Jahmar Young was named WAC Player of the Week twice during the season
 Wendell McKines' rebounding average of 10.0 reb/g is a Top 10 in All-Time Aggie history
 Gordo Castillo's 3-point FG% of 44.8% is a Top 10 in All-Time Aggie history

References
 http://www.wacsports.com/custompages/stats/basketballm/2008/nmsu.htm
 http://nmstatesports.com/schedule.aspx?schedule=74&path=mbball

New Mexico State
New Mexico State Aggies men's basketball seasons
Aggies
Aggies